Acholla ampliata is a species of assassin bug in the family Reduviidae. It is found in Central America and North America.

References

Further reading

 

Reduviidae
Articles created by Qbugbot
Insects described in 1872